Aleksandr Vladimirovich Tretyakov (born 19 April 1985) is a Russian skeleton rider. Tretyakov is Olympic champion (2014), World champion (2013), European champion (2007) as well as two-times winner of the Skeleton World Cup, which he won in 2008–09 and 2018–19.

Career
Tretyakov is the first Russian who won the World Championships (2013 in St. Moritz), the overall Skeleton World Cup (2008–09) and an Olympics bronze medal (at the 2010 Winter Olympics). He is the silver medalist of the 2011 World Championships in Königssee and 2015 World Championships in Winterberg, as well as of bronze medalist of the 2009 World Championships in Lake Placid (men's skeleton event) and 2015 World Championships in Winterberg (mixed team). In 2013 in St. Moritz, he became the world champion.

At the 2014 Winter Olympics in Sochi, Tretyakov won three out of four runs, established track (55.95) and start (4.47) records, and became the champion ahead of Martins Dukurs, who was universally considered to be the strongest gold medal contender. This was the first gold medal in skeleton for Russia. To sleep well before the second day of the competitions, Tretyakov downloaded on his cell phone the series of Russian Wikipedia articles on the economy of the Tsardom of Russia and fell asleep while reading them.

Tretyakov resides in Krasnoyarsk, Russia. His wife Anastasia is a former skeleton rider. Their daughter was born in 2013.

Controversy
Tretyakov's bottles of urine had scratch marks so he was provisionally suspended in 2016. On 22 November 2017, he was disqualified from the 2014 Winter Olympics and had his gold medal stripped from him. On 1 February 2018, the ban was overturned and his results were restored as a result of the successful appeal.

World Cup results
All results are sourced from the International Bobsleigh and Skeleton Federation (IBSF).

References

External links

1985 births
Russian male skeleton racers
Skeleton racers at the 2006 Winter Olympics
Skeleton racers at the 2010 Winter Olympics
Skeleton racers at the 2014 Winter Olympics
Skeleton racers at the 2022 Winter Olympics
Olympic skeleton racers of Russia
Medalists at the 2010 Winter Olympics
Medalists at the 2014 Winter Olympics
Olympic medalists in skeleton
Olympic gold medalists for Russia
Olympic bronze medalists for Russia
Sportspeople from Krasnoyarsk
Living people
Russian sportspeople in doping cases
Doping cases in skeleton
20th-century Russian people
21st-century Russian people